The 1977–78 County Championship was the 36th season of the Liga IV, the fourth tier of the Romanian football league system. The champions of each county association play against one from a neighboring county in a play-off  to gain promotion to Divizia C.

Promotion play-off 
Teams promoted to Divizia C without a play-off matches as teams from less represented counties in the third division.

 (AB) CIL Blaj
 (VS) Hușana Huși
 (SJ) Viitorul Șimleu Silvaniei
 (IF) Unirea Bolintin-Vale

 (TL) Arrubium Măcin
 (BR) Tractorul Viziru
 (MH) Gloria Drobeta-Turnu Severin
 (CV) Izvorul Biborțeni

The matches was played on 9 and 16 July 1978.

 
 
 

 
 

 
 

{{TwoLegResult|Avântul Gălănești (SV)||4–4 | (BT) 'Unirea Săveni| |3–1|1–3| }}

 County leagues 
 Arad County 
Seria I

Seria II

Championship final 
The matches was played on 11 and 18 June 1978.Victoria Ineu won the 1977–78 Arad County Championship and qualify for promotion play-off in Divizia C. Galați County 
Championship final Metalosport Galați won the 1977–78 Galați County Championship and qualify for promotion play-off in Divizia C. Harghita County 
 Series I

 Series II

Championship final Mureșul Toplița won the 1977–78 Harghita County Championship and qualify for promotion play-off in Divizia C.''

Hunedoara County

Olt County

Vâlcea County

See also 
 1977–78 Divizia A
 1977–78 Divizia B
 1977–78 Divizia C

References

External links
 

Liga IV seasons
4
Romania